The position of a prime minister of Nepal in modern form was called by different names at different times of Nepalese history. During the reign of the Shah kings, the Mulkajis (Chief Kajis) or Chautariyas served as prime ministers in a council of 4 Chautariyas, 4 Kajis, and sundry officers. These Bharadars (officers) were drawn from high caste and politically influential families such as the Pande, Basnyat, and Thapa families. The nobility of Gorkha was mainly based from Chetri families and they had a strong presence in civil administration affairs. All prime ministers of Nepal between 1768 and 1950 were Chhetris with the exception of Ranga Nath Poudyal, being a Khas Brahmin. Of the 23 men who have been elected since Nepal attained democracy from the Ranas in 1951, 15 have been Khas Brahmin, 3 Thakuri, 2 Newar Shresthas, 2 Chhetri, and 1 Sanyasi/Dasnami. The executive power allocation was fluctuating between Kajis and Chautariyas.

In 1804, a single authoritative position of Mukhtiyar was created by Rana Bahadur Shah which carried the executive powers of nation. Mukhtiyar held the position of head of the executive until the adoption of the title of Prime Minister in November 1843 by Mathabar Singh Thapa who became Mukhtiyar as well as Prime Minister and the Chief of the Nepalese Army. During the Rana dynasty, the position of prime minister was hereditary and the officeholder held additional titles – Maharaja of Lambjang and Kaski, Supreme Commander-in-Chief of Nepal and Grand Master of the Royal Orders of Nepal.

After the revolution of 1951, non-aristocratic citizens like Matrika Prasad Koirala held the position of prime minister still under the authority of the King of Nepal. The first general election was held in 1959 and Bishweshwar Prasad Koirala became the first elected prime minister of Nepal. However, he was deposed and imprisoned in the 1960 coup d'état by King Mahendra who went on to establish an oligarchic authoritative regime, the Panchayat system, and Nepal did not have a democratic government until 1990. After the Jana Andolan movement in 1990, the country became a constitutional monarchy. However, this was interrupted with the 2005 coup d'état by King Gyanendra. After the Loktantrik Andolan movement in 2006, the monarchy was abolished on 28 May 2008 by the 1st Constituent Assembly and the country was declared a federal parliamentary republic. The current constitution was adopted on 20 September 2015, and the first prime minister under this new constitution was KP Sharma Oli.

Heads of government of the Kingdom of Nepal (1768–2008)

Before 1800s

Mul-Kajis and Muktiyars during the Shah expansion era (1803–1846)

Prime ministers during the Rana era (1846–1951)

Prime ministers during the Transition era (1951–1960)

Prime ministers during the partyless Panchayat era (1960–1990)

Prime ministers during the Constitutional monarchy (1990–2008)

Prime ministers of the Federal Democratic Republic of Nepal (2008–present)

See also
King of Nepal
President of Nepal
Government of Nepal

References

Footnotes

Notes

Books

External links
 Office of the Prime Minister and Council of Ministers

 

Nepal
Prime Ministers